Sri Aurobindo School (full name: Sri Aurobindo Institute of Integral Education & Research (SAIIE&R)) is an Indian school, located in Sambalpur, Odisha. The school is affiliated with the Sri Aurobindo Ashram, located in Pondicherry.

History and operations
Established in 1978, it is a co-educational school with classes from nursery to 12th standard and the language of instruction is Odia.

The school is affiliated with the Board of Secondary Education, Odisha and the Council of Higher Secondary Education, Odisha.

See also

 Education in Odisha
 List of schools in Odisha

References

1978 establishments in Orissa
Education in Sambalpur
Educational institutions established in 1978
Primary schools in India
Schools affiliated with the Sri Aurobindo Ashram
High schools and secondary schools in Odisha